Yona Yahav (born 19 June 1944) is an Israeli lawyer and politician. He was formerly a member of the Knesset for the Labor Party. Yahav was the mayor of Haifa between 2003 and 2018. In the 2018 Haifa mayoral election, he lost to Einat Kalisch-Rotem.

Biography
Yahav was born in Haifa during the period of the Mandate era. During his national service he reached the rank of lieutenant colonel in the Military Police Corps of the IDF. He studied law at the Hebrew University of Jerusalem, gaining a LL.B, before continuing his legal studies at the University of London, where he served as secretary-general of the World Union of Jewish Students.

When he returned to Israel, Yahav became active in politics. He was an advisor to Minister of Transport Gad Yaacobi and the spokesman of Teddy Kollek, mayor of Jerusalem. In 1996 he was elected to the Knesset on the Labor Party list, and served as the chairman of the subcommittee for banking. However, he lost his seat in the 1999 elections.

Yahav later left Labour and joined Shinui. In 2003, he was elected mayor of Haifa on a joint Shinui-Greens ticket, having already served as deputy mayor. On 29 June 2006 he defected to Kadima, but remained mayor of the city. He is also chairman of the Haifa Economic Corporation and previously chaired the Haifa International Film Festival organisation and the city's theatre executive.

Published works
The Anatomy of the Fall of the Labor Party with Shevah Weiss (1977)
Libel and Slander (1987, updated and re-released in 1996)

References

External links

1944 births
People from Haifa
Hebrew University of Jerusalem Faculty of Law alumni
Alumni of the University of London
Israeli lawyers
Deputy Mayors of Haifa
Mayors of Haifa
Living people
Israeli Labor Party politicians
Shinui politicians
The Greens (Israel) politicians
Kadima politicians
Jews in Mandatory Palestine
Members of the 14th Knesset (1996–1999)